Llantrisant Rugby Football Club is a Welsh rugby union team based in Llantrisant in the county of Rhondda Cynon Taff. Llantrisant RFC plays in the Welsh Rugby Union, Division One East League and is a feeder club for the Cardiff Blues.

The nickname 'The Black Army' relates to the fact that the longbowmen of Llantrisant sided victoriously with Edward, the Black Prince at the Battle of Crecy.

Club badge
The club badge is a representation of the Seal of the Llantrisant Town Trust representing the arms of the Consul, De Clare and Despenser families who had historical connections with Llantrisant.

Club honours
Brewers Cup 1981-82 - Winners
Glamorgan County Silver Ball Trophy 1988-89 - Winners
Glamorgan County Silver Ball Trophy 1993-94 - Winners
WRU Division Two East Champions 2006-07 (Promoted)

Notes

Rugby clubs established in 1888
Welsh rugby union teams
Llantrisant
1888 establishments in Wales